
Boundary changes affecting the English county of Buckinghamshire.

List of places transferred from Buckinghamshire to Berkshire in 1974 
Britwell
Burnham (part)
Chalvey
Cippenham
Datchet
Ditton
Ditton Park
Eton
Eton Wick
Horton
Huntercombe
Langley
Salt Hill
Slough
Upton
Wexham (part)
Wraysbury

See also

Notes
† These areas were entirely detached from the remainder of Buckinghamshire.
‡ Detached part of Oxfordshire surrounded by Buckinghamshire
§ Detached part of Hertfordshire surrounded by Buckinghamshire

References

Buckinghamshire
History of Buckinghamshire
Local government in Buckinghamshire